Opitutus is a genus of bacteria from the family of Opitutaceae with one known species (Opitutus terrae).

References

 

Verrucomicrobiota
Bacteria genera
Monotypic bacteria genera
Taxa described in 2001